William Irvin Cowin (April 28, 1938 – August 9, 2022) was an American jurist, politician, and state cabinet secretary who served as Massachusetts Secretary of Consumer Affairs from 1971 to 1972 and Massachusetts Secretary of Administration and Finance from 1972 to 1974. He was a candidate for State Attorney General in 1974 and Lieutenant Governor of Massachusetts in 1978.

Early career
Cowin graduated from Harvard College in 1959 and Harvard Law School in 1962. From 1963 to 1966 he was an Assistant Massachusetts Attorney General. When Attorney General Edward Brooke was elected to the United States Senate, Cowin joined him as a legislative assistant. He returned to Massachusetts in 1968 as special counsel to Mayor of Boston Kevin White.

In 1969 he was named Chairman of the State Public Utilities Commission by Governor Francis W. Sargent.

State cabinet secretary
In 1971, Cowin was appointed Massachusetts Secretary of Consumer Affairs. After Secretary of Administration and Finance Robert Yasi was appointed a judge in the Suffolk Probate Court, Cowin was chosen to succeed him. As Administration and Finance Secretary Cowin was in charge of outlining the state budget.

1974 Attorney General campaign
Cowin resigned from Sargent's cabinet on May 9, 1974 to run for State Attorney General. He officially entered the race four days later. He won the convention endorsement after his two Republican opponents, Josiah Spaulding and Charles Codman Cabot, Jr., chose to bypass the convention. During the campaign, Cowin struggled to raise money  and trailed Spaulding in polls.

Cowin finished third in the Republican primary with 24% of the vote.

After the primary, Governor Sargent asked for state Republican chairman William Barnstead's resignation and recommended that Cowin succeed him. Sargent later postponed his efforts to remove Barnstead to focus on his race against Michael Dukakis.

In 1975, Cowin became a partner at Friedman & Atherton, LLP.

1978 Lieutenant Governor campaign
On May 25, 1978, Cowin and gubernatorial candidate Francis W. Hatch, Jr. announced Cowin's candidacy for lieutenant governor as Hatch's running mate.

On September 19, 1978 he defeated State Representative Peter McDowell in the Republican Primary 128,914 votes to 86,250.

On November 7, 1978, Hatch and Cowin lost the general election to Edward J. King and Thomas P. O'Neill III 53% to 47%.

Later career
From 2001 to 2008 Cowin was an associate justice of the Massachusetts Appeals Court.

Personal life
Cowin was married to retired Massachusetts Supreme Judicial Court Justice Judith Cowin. They have three grown children.

References

1938 births
2022 deaths
Harvard College alumni
Massachusetts Republicans
Massachusetts state court judges
Politicians from Newton, Massachusetts
State cabinet secretaries of Massachusetts
Massachusetts Secretaries of Administration and Finance
Harvard Law School alumni